Saif ad-Din Ghazi I (died 1149) was the Emir of Mosul from 1146 to 1149, who fought in the Second Crusade. He was the eldest son of Imad al-Din Zengi of Mosul, and the elder brother of Nur ad-Din.

Regaining control 

In 1146 Imad al-Din Zengi was besieging  the fortress of Qal Ja'bari when he was assassinated on September 15 by one of his servants who wanted to escape punishment. His forces were scattered, but Imad ad-Din Zengi's two sons were able to regain control and to divide informally the empire: Saif ad-Din succeeded him in Mosul and the Jezirah (northern Iraq) while Nur ad-Din succeeded in Aleppo. Saif ad-Din had first to fight to secure his position in Mosul.

Two years before, the Seljuk sultan Mahmud II had named his cadet son Alp-Arslan as overlord of Zengi, but the latter had neutralized him and carried with him at the siege. At Zengi's death, Alp-Arslan tried to exploit the ensuing disorder to gain the power in Mosul. Two of Zengi's advisors, the head of the diwan al-Din Muhammad Jemal and hajab  Amir Salah al-Din Muhammad al-Yaghisiyani took the side of Saif ad-Din: taking advantage of the inexperience of the young Seljuk, giving Saif ad-Din the time necessary to take control of Mosul. When Alp Arslan appeared in Mosul, he was arrested and imprisoned in the citadel.

Damascus 
In 1148, together with Nur ad-Din, he marched south to help defend Damascus during the Second Crusade (see Siege of Damascus) from the Crusaders. The atabeg of the city, Mu'in ad-Din Unur, however refused them entrance, using the presence of Zangi's sons to convince the Crusaders to release the siege.

Death
He died in November 1149 and was succeeded by another brother, Qutb ad-Din Mawdud.

See also
 Zengid dynasty

References

Sources

1149 deaths
Atabegs
Zengid emirs of Mosul
Muslims of the Second Crusade
Year of birth unknown
12th-century monarchs in the Middle East